The Provisional Congress of the Confederate States, also known as the Provisional Congress of the Confederate States of America, was a congress of deputies and delegates called together from the Southern States which became the governing body of the Provisional Government of the Confederate States from February 4, 1861, to February 17, 1862. It sat in Montgomery, Alabama, until May 21, 1861, when it adjourned to meet in Richmond, Virginia, on July 20, 1861. In both cities, it met in the existing state capitols which it shared with the respective secessionist state legislatures. It added new members as other states seceded from the Union and directed the election on November 6, 1861, at which a permanent government was elected.

First Session
The First Session of the Provisional Congress was held at Montgomery from February 4, 1861, to March 16, 1861. Members were present from Alabama, Florida, Georgia, Louisiana, Mississippi, South Carolina, and Texas. It drafted a provisional constitution and set up a government. For president and vice president, it selected Jefferson Davis of Mississippi and Alexander H. Stephens of Georgia.

Constitutional Convention
The Confederate States Constitutional Convention was held at Montgomery from February 28, 1861, to March 11, 1861.

Second Session
The Second Session of the Provisional Congress was held at Montgomery from April 29, 1861, to May 21, 1861. Members were present from Alabama, Florida, Georgia, Louisiana, Mississippi, South Carolina, Texas, Virginia, and Arkansas.

Third Session
The Third Session of the Provisional Congress was held at Richmond from July 20, 1861, to August 31, 1861. Members were present from Alabama, Florida, Georgia, Louisiana, Mississippi, South Carolina, Texas, Virginia, Arkansas, North Carolina, and Tennessee.

Fourth Session
The Fourth Session of the Provisional Congress was held at Richmond on September 3, 1861. Members were present from Alabama, Florida, Georgia, Louisiana, Mississippi, South Carolina, Texas, Virginia, Arkansas, North Carolina, and Tennessee.

Fifth Session
The Fifth Session of the Provisional Congress was held at Richmond from November 18, 1861, to February 17, 1862. Members were present from Alabama, Florida, Georgia, Louisiana, Mississippi, South Carolina, Texas, Virginia, Arkansas, North Carolina, Tennessee, Missouri, and Kentucky. One non-voting member was present from the Arizona Territory.

Leadership

 President: Howell Cobb

Members

Deputies
Deputies from the first seven states to secede formed the first two sessions of the Congress.

Alabama
 Richard W. Walker
 Robert H. Smith
 Colin J. McRae
 John Gill Shorter (resigned November 1861)
 Cornelius Robinson (took his seat on April 29, 1861 – Elected to fill vacancy; resigned January 24, 1862)
 W. P. Chilton
 Stephen F. Hale
 David P. Lewis (resigned April 29, 1861)
 Nic. Davis, Jr. (took his seat on April 29, 1861 – Elected to fill vacancy)
 Thomas Fearn (resigned April 29, 1861)
 H. C. Jones (took his seat on April 29, 1861 – Elected to fill vacancy)
 J. L. M. Curry

Florida
 J. Patton Anderson (resigned April 8, 1861)
 George Taliaferro Ward (took his seat on  May 2, 1861 – Elected to fill vacancy; resigned February 5, 1862)
 John Pease Sanderson (took his seat on  February 5, 1862 – Appointed to fill vacancy)
 James B. Owens
 Jackson Morton (took his seat on  February 6, 1861)

Georgia
 Robert Toombs
 Howell Cobb
 F. S. Bartow (killed July 21, 1861 at the First Battle of Bull Run)
 Thomas Marsh Forman (took his seat on August 7, 1861 – Appointed to fill vacancy)
 M. J. Crawford
 E. A. Nisbet (resigned December 10, 1861)
 Nathan Henry Bass, Sr. (took his seat on January 14, 1862 – Appointed to fill vacancy)
 B. H. Hill
 A. R. Wright
 T. R. R. Cobb
 A. H. Kenan
 A. H. Stephens

Louisiana
 John Perkins, Jr.
 Alexander de Clouet
 Charles M. Conrad
 Duncan F. Kenner
 Edward Sparrow
 Henry Marshall

Mississippi
 A. M. Clayton (resigned May 11, 1861)
 Alexander Blackburn Bradford (took his seat on December 5, 1861 – Elected to fill vacancy)
 James T. Harrison
 William S. Barry
 J. A. P. Campbell
 Wiley P. Harris
 Walker Brooke
 William S. Wilson (resigned April 29, 1861)
 J. A. Orr (took his seat on April 29, 1861 – Elected to fill vacancy)

South Carolina
 Robert Barnwell Rhett
 Robert W. Barnwell
 Christopher Gustavus Memminger
 James Chesnut, Jr.
 William Porcher Miles
 Laurence M. Keitt
 Thomas J. Withers (resigned May 21, 1861 after second session)
 James Lawrence Orr (took his seat on February 17, 1862 – Appointed to fill vacancy)
 William W. Boyce

Texas
 John Gregg (took his seat on February 15, 1861)
 Thomas N. Waul (took his seat on February 19, 1861)
 W. S. Oldham (took his seat on March 2, 1861)
 J. H. Reagan (took his seat on March 2, 1861)
 John Hemphill (took his seat on March 2, 1861; died January 4, 1862)
 W. B. Ochiltree (took his seat on March 2, 1861)
 L. T. Wigfall (took his seat on March 2, 1861)

Delegates
Representatives from states to secede after the Battle of Fort Sumter were referred to as delegates, in contrast to the deputies from the original seven states.

Arkansas
 Augustus Hill Garland
 Robert Ward Johnson
 Albert Rust
 Hugh French Thomason
 William Wirt Watkins

Kentucky
 Henry Cornelius Burnett
 Theodore Legrand Burnett
 John Milton Elliott
 George Washington Ewing
 Samuel Howard Ford
 George Baird Hodge
 Thomas Johnson
 Thomas Bell Monroe
 John J. Thomas
 Daniel Price White

Missouri
 Caspar Wistar Bell
 John Bullock Clark, Sr.
 Aaron H. Conrow
 William Mordecai Cooke, Sr.
 Thomas W. Freeman
 Thomas Alexander Harris
 Robert Ludwell Yates Peyton
 George Graham Vest
 Delegate-elect Hyer never took his seat

North Carolina
 William Waightstill Avery
 Francis Burton Craige
 Allen Turner Davidson
 George Davis
 Thomas David Smith McDowell
 John Motley Morehead
 Richard Clauselle Puryear
 Thomas Hart Ruffin
 William Nathan Harrell Smith
 Abraham Watkins Venable

Tennessee
 John DeWitt Clinton Atkins
 Robert Looney Caruthers
 David Maney Currin
 William Henry DeWitt
 John Ford House
 Thomas McKissick Jones
 James Houston Thomas

Virginia
 Thomas Salem Bocock
 Alexander Boteler
 John White Brockenbrough
 Gideon D. Camden (resigned June 1861)
 R. M. T. Hunter
 Robert Johnston
 William Hamilton MacFarland
 James Mason
 Walter Preston
 William Ballard Preston
 Roger Atkinson Pryor
 William Cabell Rives
 Charles Wells Russell
 Robert Eden Scott
 James Alexander Seddon
 Waller Redd Staples
 John Tyler (died January 18, 1862)

Arizona Territory
 Granville Henderson Oury

Notes

References

 
 Thomas, Emory M. (1998), The Confederate State of Richmond: A Biography of the Capital, Louisiana State University Press.

Further reading

External links

 

 
1861 establishments in the Confederate States of America
1862 disestablishments in the Confederate States of America
Confederate States
Defunct national legislatures
Legislative branch of the Confederate States of America government
Confederate States